Rob Parker (born 5 September 1981) is an English former professional rugby league footballer who played in the 2000s and 2010s. He played for Leigh (Heritage No. 1352), signing from Super League neighbours Salford City Reds in time for the 2012 season. An England international representative forward, he previously played for Super League clubs; the Bradford Bulls, London Broncos and the Warrington Wolves.

Playing career

Rugby League
Parker played his junior rugby with Leigh East. Débuting in 2000, Parker marked his case for a regular position in Super League during a ten-game loan spell with the London Broncos in 2001. He then rose out of the Bradford Bulls Academy to play in the pack. He collected Super League medals in 2003 and 2005 and played in a winning Challenge Cup Final (2003) and World Club Challenge (2004). He missed out on a spot in the 2003 Super League Grand Final. Having won Super League VIII, the Bradford Bulls played against 2003 NRL Premiers, the Penrith Panthers in the 2004 World Club Challenge. Parker played from the interchange bench in the Bradford Bull's 22–4 victory. At the end of that year he played for the Bradford Bulls from the interchange bench in their 2004 Super League Grand Final loss against Leeds.

Rugby Union
An accomplished performer in both front and second row. Whilst at the Bradford Bulls, Parker was loaned out to Wakefield RFC where he made seven rugby union appearances over two seasons.

International
He was appointed England captain in 2004 and led England to the European Nations Cup. Parker won 3 caps for England while at the Bradford Bulls in 2004 against Russia, France and Ireland.

He was signed by the Warrington Wolves for 2006's Super League XI, released from his contract at the end of the 2008 season. After joining Salford City Reds he was announced as their new club captain on 10 February after long-serving captain Malcolm Alker was stripped of the captaincy during pre-season.

In July 2011, he went on loan to the Castleford Tigers (Heritage No. 919). Parker joined hometown club the Leigh Centurions in time for the 2012 Co-operative Championship season.

References

External links

1981 births
Living people
Bradford Bulls players
Castleford Tigers players
England national rugby league team captains
England national rugby league team players
English rugby league players
Leigh Leopards captains
Leigh Leopards players
London Broncos players
People from Westhoughton
Rugby league players from Greater Manchester
Rugby league props
Rugby league second-rows
Salford Red Devils captains
Salford Red Devils players
Wakefield RFC players
Warrington Wolves players